Parliamentary elections were held in Andorra on 7 April 2019, electing all 28 seats of the General Council. Although they remained the largest party, the Democrats for Andorra lost their parliamentary majority after losing four seats. The Social Democratic Party gained four seats, becoming the second-largest party.

Background 
Democrats for Andorra secured an absolute majority in the 2015 election and Antoni Martí was re-elected Prime Minister of Andorra. In December 2017, Josep Pintat Forné, together with the two members of the Lauredian Union and two members of Committed Citizens, left the Liberal group.

Antoni Martí was unable to stand for reelection, as the Constitution limits the office to two complete consecutive terms.

Electoral system
Twenty-eight general councillors (Catalan: consellers generals) are elected, based on closed party lists:
Fourteen general councillors representing the seven parishes (two councillors per parish) are elected from the list with most votes in each parish.
Fourteen general councillors are elected from national lists using the largest remainder method of proportional representation.

The parish lists and the national list are independent of one another: the same person cannot appear on both the national list and on a parish list, and voters cast two separate ballots. There is no requirement to vote for the same party for both lists.

Parties and leaders

Nationwide constituency
The following parties or coalitions are running in the election:

Parish constituencies
The following table displays the parties or coalitions running at each parish:

Opinion polls

Results

By parish

Government formation
Three parties eventually formed a governing coalition, composed of the Democrats, the Liberal Party and Committed Citizens with Xavier Espot Zamora as Prime Minister.

References

External links
Official website

Andorra
Parliamentary
Andorra
2019 election
Parliamentary elections in Andorra